The All-Ukrainian Congress of Soviets was the supreme governing body of the Ukrainian Soviet Socialist Republic from 1917–38. From 1922 to 1938 the Constitution of the Ukrainian SSR designated after the 1918 Russian Constitution mandated that Congress to be convened at least twice a year. The 1926 Constitution (in correspondence to all Soviet constitutions) lowered the minimum to once a year.

In total there were 14 Congresses of Soviets that for the most of the time took place in Kharkiv.

Description
Following the end of the Russian Civil War and foreign military intervention, in Ukraine the ruling party of Bolsheviks continued actively to use the Soviet form of dictatorship of proletariat in its internal policy. Formation of composition and structure of the All-Ukrainian Congress of Soviets, the All-Ukrainian Central Executive Committee, and its Presidium continued to be carried out with help of undemocratic and multi-stage electoral system under the leadership of the Bolshevik Party organs. According to the 1919 Constitution of the Ukrainian SSR, active and passive electoral right at elections to local Soviets was granted only to workers, soldiers, and sailors as well as foreigners who belonged to workers' class and working peasantry (Article 20). Deprived of the right to vote, "even if they belong to one of the above categories", were those individuals who used hired labor with a selfish purpose or live on unearned income, private traders, commercial middlemen, monks and spiritual superiors, officials and agents of former police, members of the House of Romanov, deranged and those who are under guardianship, sentenced. The constitutional legislation of the Russian SFSR and other union republics has deprived of the right to vote those categories of people for political and laborious conditions. Later those restriction expanded to those "working elements" who labeled themselves by clearly kulak actions or active protests against the Soviet regime, former Petlurites, "bandits of any kind", moonshiners, deserters, and other enemies of the Soviet regime.

History

Cancelled First Congress (Kyiv)

The very first Congress of Soviet initially took place in Kyiv on December 17 (December 4, old style), 1917 in the hall of the M.Sadovsky Theater (also known as Trinity Public House). Over 2500 delegates participated at the congress. The Congress was called by the Kyiv regional soviet of workers' and soldiers' deputies on the request of the Bolshevik organizations of Ukraine. Concurrently on December 16–18, 1917 in Kyiv was taken place a regional congress of Bolsheviks of Ukraine. The Bolshevik Congress created a united political party of Ukraine the "RSDLP(b) - Social-Democracy of Ukraine" headed by the Chief Committee.

The first addressed issue was the election of the Congress presidium which was headed by the honorary chairman of congress Mykhailo Hrushevsky. The central question on the congress agenda was the "Ultimatum of the Sovnarkom of Russia to the Central Council of Ukraine". On December 18, 1917, the congress condemned the ultimatum. The Bolshevik faction leader and member of organizational committee Vladimir Zatonsky announced that there has been a misunderstanding as too many delegates that were present at the congress without a right of vote. Zatonsky proposed to announce a break and check credentials of all delegates. As an answer to the proposal, the leader of the Peasant Association Mykola Stasyuk declared that the regional committee of Soviets of Workers' and Soldiers' Deputies wished to falsify the will of Ukrainian people by giving preference to workers and soldier who in addition were not even Ukrainians over peasants. Therefore, the central committee of the Peasant Association took care on its part to increase the peasant representation at the congress. After that Bolsheviks proposed to recognize the congress as a consultative meeting. When the proposal was rejected, the 127 supporters of Bolsheviks left the congress in protest. The rest participating delegates recognized the assembly as a competent congress. On December 18, 1917, the 124 delegates from 49 Soviets who left the Kyiv Congress gathered at a separate meeting in the Kyiv Central Bureau of Trade Unions.

First Congress (Kharkiv)

On December 21, 1917, the Red Guards of the Soviet Russia led by Vladimir Antonov-Ovseyenko occupied Kharkiv. At night on December 22, 1917, the Russian Red Guards with local Bolsheviks disarmed Ukrainian military units and arrested leaders of the Kharkiv City Council and garrison. On December 23, 1917 Bolsheviks established a revkom (revolutionary committee). The headquarters of a local Red Guard was established on December 14, 1917, and was located in the Stock Exchange building at Market Square (today Ploshcha Konstytutsii or Constitution Square).

On December 24–25, 1917 in the Kharkiv building of Noble Assembly (Market Square) another First Congress of Soviets was held. The congress gathered initially 964 participants, amount of which later grew to 1250. The congress reviewed several issues: attitudes towards the Central Council of Ukraine, war and peace as well as about organization of military force, about Ukraine and Soviet Russia, estate and financial issues and others.

The congress approved the Treaty of Brest-Litovsk between Russian SFSR and Central Powers, declared the independence of the Soviet Ukrainian People's Republic as a federative republic of Soviet Russia, Law about socialization of land adopted by the 3rd All-Russian Congress of Soviets, "About state system", decrees on 8-hour work day and labor control, organization of the Workers-Peasant Red Army of Ukraine. The policy of the Central Council of Ukraine in the resolution "About political moment" was condemned requesting withdrawal of the Austrian and German Armed Forces from Ukraine. Participants elected the new composition of the Central Executive Committee of Ukraine of 102 members headed by Vladimir Zatonsky.

Second Congress (Katerynoslav)
The Second All-Ukrainian Congress of Soviets took place in Katerynoslav.

Transformation
The Congress ceased to exist at the end of the constitutional reform of 1936-1937, when the first on the union and then at the republican levels indirect election to Soviets were replaced by direct elections at all levels with the Supreme Soviet as the highest body.

List of all congresses

Election 

According to article 24 of the 1929 Constitution, the Congress was composed by delegates from the All-Modavian Congress of Soviets and the Congresses of Soviets of the Okruhas. For every 10,000 voters in cities and urban-type settlements and every 50,000 inhabitants of rural council areas, one delegate should be elected.

Powers 
The exclusive jurisdiction of the Congress consisted of:
Election of the Central Executive Committee of Ukraine
Adoption of the Constitution of the Ukrainian SSR and amendments to it.
Approval of amendments proposed by the Central Executive Committee
Approval of constitutions of the autonomous republics of Ukraine
On the other issues the Congress and Central Executive Committee had the same authority.

See also
 Verkhovna Rada
 Congress of Soviets

Bibliography
 Khmil, I.V., Shatalina, Ye.P., Hrytsenko, A.P., Boiko, O.D., Yefimenko, H.H. Encyclopedia of Ukraine. Vol.1. "Naukova dumka" (Scientific Thought). Kyiv, 2003.
 History of state and law of Ukrainian SSR. Vol.2. "Naukova dumka" (Scientific Thought). Kyiv, 1987.
 Honcharenko, V.D. All-Ukrainian Congress of Soviets of Workers', Peasants', and Red-Armymen Deputies - the Supreme body of authority of the Ukrainian SSR in 1917-37. Educational and Methodical Compilation of Higher Education. Kyiv, 1990.

References

External links
 Handbook on history of the Communist Party and the Soviet Union 1898-1991 - an extensive historical electronic project intended to recover records concerned with the Soviet history and history of the Communist Party of USSR
 First All-Ukrainian Congress of Soviets (Kalinichenko, V.V., Rybalka, I.K.)
 All-Ukrainian Congress of Soviets at the Institute of History of Ukraine website
 Info on the Second All-Ukrainian Congress of Soviets at the Institute of History of Ukraine website
 Manifest to the Ukrainian people with ultimatum request to the Ukrainian Council (МАНІФЕСТ ДО УКРАЇНСЬКОГО НАРОДУ З УЛЬТИМАТИВНИМИ ВИМОГАМИ ДО УКРАЇНСЬКОЇ РАДИ). December 16, 1917.

 
Government of the Ukrainian Soviet Socialist Republic
Historical legislatures
Russian Revolution in Ukraine
1917 establishments in Ukraine
1938 disestablishments in Ukraine